was a kabuki play of the Kabuki Jūhachiban, first performed in 1699. It is no longer extant.

Uwanari-uchi
 was a marital custom dating back to the Heian period. As marriage was not clearly defined, no ceremony took place that marked the status of a woman as a 'wife', although men would often join the households of their wives and receive material support. Custom therefore allowed the first wife to vent her anger on the second wife for stealing her husband's affections, usually in the form of attacking her house. Uwanari-uchi persisted until the early sixteenth century as a socially acceptable custom.

See also
Ōko Uwanari-uchi no Zu, an ukiyo-e by Utagawa Hiroshige

References 

1699 plays
Kabuki plays